Roma Ligocka (born Roma Liebling, 13 November 1938 in Kraków, Poland) is a Polish writer, and painter.

She was born in a Jewish family in Kraków a year before World War II. During the German occupation of Poland, her family was persecuted by the Nazis - her father was incarcerated, first in the Płaszów and then Auschwitz concentration camps. In 1940, she was taken with her mother to the Kraków Ghetto but, before the end of the ghetto in 1943, they fled and hid with a Polish family. After World War II, she studied painting and scenic design in the Academy of Fine Arts in Kraków. Then, she worked with considerable success in theatre, film, and television as a set designer. In 1965, she and her husband, Jan Biczycki, left the Communist Poland and moved to Munich, Germany, where she continued with her set design assignments.
Roma Ligocka is Roman Polanski's cousin.

Novels
She has written several novels, some of them reflecting her biography:
 The Girl in the Red Coat (Dziewczynka w czerwonym płaszczyku)
 Znajoma z lustra
 Kobieta w podróży
 Tylko ja sama (originally published in German)
 Wszystko z miłości

Her novel, The Girl in the Red Coat, was inspired by Steven Spielberg's movie, Schindler's List. After watching the movie, she recognized herself as a Jewish child that wore a red coat.

References

External links
Roma Ligocka and her writing - a website created by her publisher (Polish)
Bibliography of Roma Ligocka  - National Library of Poland

Artists from Kraków
Polish women writers
1938 births
Living people
Kraków Ghetto inmates
Holocaust survivors